Donald Byrd (born 1949) is an American modern dance choreographer, known for themes relating to social justice, and in particular, racism.

Career 
For 24 years, beginning 1978, Byrd was the founding artistic director of Donald Byrd/The Group, which toured extensively, nationally and internationally until 2002, when he suspended operations due to financial duress. The Group was based in Los Angeles from 1978 to 1983 and in New York City from 1983 to 2002. For  years, since 2002, Byrd has been artistic director of The Spectrum Dance Theater, based in Seattle.  He is credited for having elevated Spectrum to a company of national rank.

Byrd has choreographed more than 80 modern dance works for his own companies and other companies, including the Alvin Ailey American Dance Theater, the Dayton Contemporary Dance Company (for  years, since 1989), The Philadelphia Dance Company (Phildanco). Byrd also has choreographed for classical companies. He has worked with acclaimed theater and opera companies, including the New York Shakespeare Festival/Public Theater, La Jolla Playhouse, the Intiman Theatre, the San Francisco Opera, the Seattle Opera, and the New York City Opera.

2017 premier 
Spectrum Dance Theater premiered Byrd's work, Shot, in January 2017, at the Seattle Repertory Theater. The performance included multimedia (video) and even a lecture in the middle in an acclaimed albeit visceral depiction of the 2016 fatal shooting of Keith Lamont Scott in Charlotte, North Carolina, and the pleading of his wife, Reykia Scott – "Stop! Please don't shoot!" "Don't shoot him! Don't shoot him! He has no weapon! He has no weapon. Don't shoot him!"

2019 premier 

The Alvin Ailey American Dance Theater premiered Byrd's work, Greenwood, December 6, 2019, at City Center in New York City. Byrd described his work as "theater of disruption"  "it disrupts our thinking about things, especially, in particular, things around race." The dance performance addresses a 1921 racist mob attack in Tulsa's segregated Greenwood District, which, at the time, was one of the country's most affluent African American communities, known as "America's Black Wall Street." Byrd uses the Rashomon method, depicting three scenarios of what might have happened in an elevator.

As dancer and educator 
Byrd, in 1972, was a member of the Twyla Tharp Dance Company; and in 1976, he was a member of Gus Solomons Jr.'s, Dance Company.

Byrd was dance instructor at the California Institute of the Arts from 1976 through 1982, a period when other notable colleagues taught there, including Cristyne Elizabeth Lawson (born 1935) (Dean), Larry A. Attaway (né Larry Amos Attaway; born 1949), Rebecca Bobele (1946–1995), Gloria Bowen, Mia Slavenska (1916–2002), Tina Yuan (born 1947), and Sandra Neels. Byrd taught at University of California-Santa Cruz, Ohio University, and Wesleyan University. In 1993, he was Associate Artist at the Yale Repertory Theater.

Byrd has been member of board of directors for the Dance Theater Workshop and Dance USA in Washington, D.C., the national service organization for professional dance, established in 1982.

Awards 
 Special mention, 3rd Grand Prix International Video Dance Festival, 1990
 Bessie Award, 1992, for The Minstrel Show
 Emerging Dance Award, Metropolitan Life Foundation

Family and growing up 
Byrd was born July 21, 1949, in New London, North Carolina, to Jeter Byrd Jr., and Emmarene Clark (maiden; 1928–1999). His parents divorced shortly after he was born; and soon after that, with his mother, he moved from New London to Clearwater, Florida. Donald's mother remarried and, around the time he was entering the fifth grade, she and her new husband moved to the Midwest. Donald stayed in Clearwater and was raised by his maternal grandmother, Willie Mae Clark (née Willie Mae Chester; 1910–1993), through high school, until he graduated 1967 from Pinellas High, a bygone segregated school (closed after June 1968) in the Greenwood section of downtown Clearwater. Growing up, his first love, according to biographies, was music. To that end, Byrd studied classical flute; and as a flutist, he became a member of the Pinellas Youth Symphony. He was also a drum major with the Pinellas High School band – the Panthers Marching Band. In high school, Byrd participated in theatrical projects and the debate team.

Byrd's first exposure to dance came when he was 16 years old. Two dancers from Balanchine's New York City Ballet – Edward Villella and Patricia McBride – conducted a lecture-demonstration in Clearwater, which Byrd attended. The dancers left an impression on Byrd, though it was several years later before he began formal training in dance.

Higher education 
In 1967, Byrd attended Yale University, initially majoring in philosophy, though he had thoughts of becoming an actor. At Yale, Byrd attended every play produced by the School of Drama and the Long Wharf Theatre. Yale was also where Byrd experienced overt racism for the first time, in the form of slurs and insults, these contrasting with the institutionalized racism of segregation that he had encountered growing up in the South.

The summer after his first year, Byrd's prowess on the flute earned him the opportunity to join an ensemble that toured Europe. On his return from Europe, Byrd decided to leave Yale, where he did not feel entirely welcome, and enroll in Tufts University in Boston.

One of the first friends Byrd made at Tufts was William Hurt. By this time, Byrd had begun to study acting seriously. It was from Hurt that Byrd first heard about the Alvin Ailey Dance Theater. On Hurt's suggestion, Byrd attended a performance of Ailey's signature work, Revelations. As put by his biography in Encyclopedia.com, "the performance was indeed a revelation for Byrd; for the first time in his life, he became aware of the theatrical power of dance."

Higher education timeline 
 1967–1968: Attended Yale University for one year
 1968–1974: Attended Tufts University and, in 1974, earned a Bachelor of Arts degree
 Studied with Mia Slavenska for six years
 1969–1973: Attended Cambridge School of Ballet, Cambridge, Massachusetts
 Attended Harvard Summer Dance Center in the 1970s; he taught repertory dance classes there in the 1980s
 1972: Attended London School of Contemporary Dance
 1976: Attended Alvin Ailey American Dance Theater Center

Selected works

Collaborators 
Among many others, Byrd has collaborated with composer Mio Morales on several works, including:
 1988: Shards, choreography by Donald Byrd; music by Mio Morales
 1993: The Minstrel Show, acts for coons, jigaboos, and jungle bunnies, presented by Dance Theater Workshop; artistic direction and choreography by Donald Byrd; original music by Mio Morales
 Drastic Cuts, choreography by Donald Byrd; music by Mio Morales
 1992: A Folk Dance, premiered in 1992 by the Alvin Ailey American Dance Theater; choreography by Donald Byrd; music by Mio Morales
 1988: Partite, presented by Donald Byrd/The Group; choreography by Donald Byrd; music by Mio Morales

Organizations 
 The Donald Byrd Dance Foundation, Inc., a New York not-for-profit corporation established February 7, 1985

Quotes

Videography 
 "Fall Studio Series 2010: An Inside Look," Spectrum Dance Theater via YouTube
 Donald Byrd excerpt, Spectrum Dance Theater (2011)
 Shards, choreographed by Byrd, performed by Ailey 2 on their 2011 UK tour
 The Mother of Us All, Spectrum Dance Theater (2011)
 Dance, Dance, Dance, choreographed by Byrd, performed by the Spectrum Dance Theater (2016) via YouTube
 Shot, choreographed by Byrd, performed by the Spectrum Dance Theater (2017)
 Bhangra Fever, choreography by Byrd, performed by the Spectrum Dance Theater (2018)
 Donald Byrd Choreography, performed by the Spectrum Dance Theater (2019)
 Greenwood, premiered 2019 by the Alvin Ailey American Dance Theater (2019) via YouTube
 Harlem Nutcracker, discussion by Byrd, choreographed by Byrd, performed by the Spectrum Dance Theater (2019)

Notes and references

Notes

References 

1949 births
American choreographers
African-American choreographers
American male ballet dancers
African-American dancers
African-American male dancers
Modern dance
Modern dancers
20th-century African-American artists
20th-century American artists
20th-century American dancers
21st-century African-American artists
21st-century American artists
21st-century American dancers
People from Clearwater, Florida
Tufts University alumni
Yale University people
California Institute of the Arts faculty
University of California, Santa Cruz people
Ohio University people
Wesleyan University people
Living people